Taeniura is a genus of stingrays in the family Dasyatidae. The species Taeniurops grabata and T. meyeni were formerly placed in this genus. However, phylogenetic research has shown that these two species are not closely related to T. lymma, and they have been assigned to a separate genus, Taeniurops.

Species
Taeniura lessoni Last, White & Naylor, 2016 (Oceania fantail ray)
Taeniura lymma (Forsskål, 1775) (Bluespotted ribbontail ray)

References 

 
Dasyatidae
Ray genera
Taxa named by Johannes Peter Müller
Taxa named by Friedrich Gustav Jakob Henle